Kavrepalanchok District is one of the 77 districts of Nepal. It is a part of Bagmati Province and has a population of 381,937.

Information Technology Park is also located in this district.

Geography and climate

Demographics
At the time of the 2011 Nepal census, Kavrepalanchok District had a population of 381,937. Of these, 50.5% spoke Nepali, 34.0% Tamang, 11.1% Newari, 1.6% Danuwar, 1.4% Magar, 0.4% Majhi, 0.2% Maithili, 0.1% Bhojpuri, 0.1% Hindi, 0.1% Rai and 0.1% other languages as their first language.

In terms of ethnicity/caste, 34.5% were Tamang, 21.5% Hill Brahmin, 13.3% Chhetri, 13.2% Newar, 3.8% Magar, 2.4% Kami, 1.9% Sarki, 1.8% Danuwar, 1.5% Damai/Dholi, 0.9% Gharti/Bhujel, 0.8% Thakuri, 0.9% Pahari, 0.9% Sanyasi/Dasnami, 0.7% Majhi, 0.3% other Dalit, 0.3% Gurung, 0.3% Rai, 0.1% Bhote, 0.1% Limbu, 0.1% Musalman, 0.1% other Terai, 0.1% Tharu and 0.2% others.

In terms of religion, 62.6% were Hindu, 34.6% Buddhist, 1.8% Christian, 0.6% Prakriti, 0.1% Muslim and 0.3% others.

In terms of literacy, 69.3% could read and write, 2.8% could only read and 27.9% could neither read nor write.

Administration
The district consists of 13 Municipalities, out of which six are urban municipalities and seven are rural municipalities. These are as follows:
Dhulikhel Municipality
Banepa Municipality
Panauti Municipality
Panchkhal Municipality
Namobuddha Municipality
Mandandeupur Municipality
Khani Khola Rural Municipality
Chauri Deurali Rural Municipality
Temal Rural Municipality
Bethanchok Rural Municipality
Bhumlu Rural Municipality
Mahabharat Rural Municipality
Roshi Rural Municipality

Health Care
The small health centers in many VDCs are without Auxiliary Health Workers (AHWs), Auxiliary Nurse Midwives (ANMs) and Community Health Workers (CHWs). So, people seeking emergency health assistance have to travel a long distance to the district headquarters or Kathmandu or end up dying because of lack of treatment. Many people still believe in Dhami and Jhakri and don't always seek medicine or go to the hospital for the treatment.
An NGO, PHASE Nepal provides many health care facilities and training programs to Ryale, a VDC of Kavrepalanchok District.
Currently PHASE Nepal is working on several projects in this district including community health and education, livelihood, hygiene and sanitation programmes. The main aim of PHASE Nepal is to provide awareness to the local people and help to know about sanitation, livelihood, hygiene and community health and education.

Tourism

Kavrepalanchok district has great potential in tourism industry. Kavrepalanchok district is culturally rich with historical places like Dhulikhel, Sangaswoti - Bangthali, Panauti, Banepa and Chandeni Mandan. Chandeni Mandan contains the lowest and highest points of the district, the Indrawoti river and Thamdanda, respectively; the latter offers hiking and a 360-degree panorama including the top of the world. There are big religious fairs like Chandeshwari Jatra of Banepa, Namobuddha Jatra of Namobuddha which is celebrated on the birth date of Buddha (Buddha Purnima), Kumbha mela of Panauti which happens every twelfth year.

The Long Himalayan Gaurishankar range can be seen from Dhulikhel and Sangaswoti Range. Kavrepalanchok is famous for short-circuit trekking in places like Dhungkharka-Narayanthan, Dhulikhel-Kavre-Namobuddha-Sankhu-Panauti-Banepa. Some places to visit here in Kavrepalanchok districts are: Saping Siddhi Ganesh Temple, Saping Mulkharka Bhimsenthan, Palanchok Bhagwati, Namobuddha, Dhulikhel, Gaukhureshwar, Hajar Sidhi (1000 Steps to Kali Devi Temple), Devisthan (where Kali Devi Temple is situated), Thulo Bangthali, Talu Dada view Tower, Gosainthan, Banepa, Khopasi, Pasthali, Balthali, Ladkeshwar Mahadev, Nepalthok, Patlekhet, Phulbari, Dapcha and many more.

Koshipari (i.e. east of Dolalghat/Sunkoshi River) has very good prospect in tourism field. There are many adventurous places such as Thulo Bangthali. Recently a new trail known as Sangaswoti range hills trail has been opened for hikers. Though the road network is still under development and a good paved road is lacking, Koshipari can certainly be used as the cycling spots. Once the condition of road is well constructed, this place will quickly be developed into many beautiful tourism spots. However, there are already homestays and lodges in Thulo Bangthali. Many travellers choose Laure-Bangthali trail to reach Shailung and Everest. The wild native forest in Bangthali area is rich in bio-diversity. More than 700 different kind of herbs are found in this jungle. Recently this place has been famous for bird watching and volunteering. Community leader and social entrepreneur Bijay Khadka was able to bring more than 576 tourist to Bangthali in 2018.

Religious places in Kabhrepalanchowk 
Bethanchok Narayansthan (Bethanchok)
Mulkharka Bhimsenthan (Saping), 
Saping Siddhi Ganesh Temple, (Ramche)
Khandadevi (Nagregagarche)
Kuseshwor Mahadev (Nepalthok)
Dhaneshwor Mahadev (Panauti),
Chandeshwori Mata (Banepa),
Indrashwor Mahadev (Panauti),
ugrachandi Bhagawati (Nala),
lokeswor karunamaya nala
Dankali Devi (Eklekhet),
Timal Narayan dham (Timal),
Palanchok Bhagawati (Palanchok), 
Kedhreshwor Mahadev, 
Khopasi
Fadkeshwor Mahadev, 
Ladku Ladkeshwor Mahadev.
Namo Buddha Monastery

Education 
There are many private and governmental schools providing education to the secondary level within the district.

Kathmandu University, located in Dhulikhel is the third-oldest university in Nepal.

References

External links

 Neppol Megasite
 

 
Districts of Nepal established in 1962
Districts of Bagmati Province